Yeşilyurt Women’s Volleyball, now renamed to Bakırköy Belediyesi Yeşilyurt Women’s Volleyball, is the women's volleyball section of Turkish sports club Yeşilyurt S.K. in İstanbul, Turkey. The team is playing its home matches at the Yeşilyurt Arena.

Current squad
.

Head coach: Üzeyir Özdurak

Former players

 Tülin Altıntaş
 Ergül Avcı
 Pelin Çelik (2001-2003)
 Neslihan Demir Darnel (1998-2002)
 Esra Gümüş (2000-2004)
 Özge Kırdar (2005-2006)
 Eylem Şenkal
 Bahar Toksoy (2004-2006)

 Oksana Parkhomenko (2000-2001)

 Saymai Paladsrichuay (2008-2009)
 Narumon Khanan (2008-2009)

References

External links
 Official Yeşilyurt Volleyball Website 
 Turkish Volleyball Federation Official Website 

Volleyball clubs in Istanbul
Sport in Bakırköy
Women's volleyball teams in Turkey
1956 establishments in Turkey
Volleyball clubs established in 1956

Turkish volleyball clubs